Enrique José Arathoon Pacas (born 18 January 1992) is a Salvadoran competitive sailor. He competed at the 2016 Summer Olympics in Rio de Janeiro, in the men's Laser class.

He represented El Salvador at the 2020 Summer Olympics.

References

External links
 
 
 

1992 births
Living people
Salvadoran male sailors (sport)
Olympic sailors of El Salvador
Sailors at the 2016 Summer Olympics – Laser
Pan American Games competitors for El Salvador
Sailors at the 2015 Pan American Games
Competitors at the 2014 Central American and Caribbean Games
Central American and Caribbean Games bronze medalists for El Salvador
Sailors at the 2019 Pan American Games
Central American and Caribbean Games medalists in sailing
Sailors at the 2020 Summer Olympics – Laser